The Sainte-Catherine tram stop is located on line  of the tramway de Bordeaux.

Situation 
The station is located on Cours d'Alsace et Lorraine in Bordeaux.

Junctions

Close by 
 Sainte-Catherine Street

See also 
 TBC
 Tramway de Bordeaux

Bordeaux tramway stops
Tram stops in Bordeaux
Railway stations in France opened in 2003